CoRoT-18b is a transiting exoplanet found by the CoRoT space telescope in 2011.

It is a hot Jupiter-sized planet orbiting a G9V star with Te = 5440K, M = 0.95M☉, R = 1.00R☉, and near-solar metallicity. Its age is unknown.

The study in 2012, utilizing a Rossiter–McLaughlin effect, have determined the planetary orbit is probably aligned with the rotational axis of the star, misalignment equal to -10°.

References

Hot Jupiters
Transiting exoplanets
Exoplanets discovered in 2011
18b